"Just By Being You (Halo and Wings)" is a song written by Britton Cameron and Canadian country music singer Patricia Conroy, and recorded by American country music duo Steel Magnolia.  It was released on July 20, 2010 as the second single from their self-titled debut album, which was released on January 11, 2011.

Critical reception 
Kevin John Coyne, of Country Universe, gave the song a "C" rating, stating that the song could put Matchbox Twenty fans to sleep. He also said that the duo could have come up with something worthy of their time and effort.

Music video 
The song was made into a music video, which premiered on Country Music Television on July 2, 2010. The video was directed by Kristin Barlowe. In the video, the duo perform in the middle of woods, while in the backdrop are two children playing. As the video progresses, special effects are used to simulate the children, as well as Steel Magnolia, turning into angels.

Chart performance 
"Just By Being You (Halo and Wings)" debuted on the Billboard Hot Country Songs chart in June 2010, prior to its official radio release. Since then, it has become Steel Magnolia's second Top 40 single on that chart. It peaked at number 25 on the country charts in November 2010.

References 

2010 singles
2010 songs
Steel Magnolia songs
Song recordings produced by Dann Huff
Big Machine Records singles
Songs written by Patricia Conroy